Superliga Femenina de Voleibol 2013–14 was the 45th season since its establishment. The season comprises regular season and championship playoffs. Regular season started in October 2013, and finished on March 29, 2014.

Championship playoffs began on April 5, with semifinal matches and finished with the Final matches during April.

Defending champions are Haro Rioja Voley having defeated Nuchar Tramek Murillo in the championship playoff final of previous season.

Embalajes Blanco Tramek Murillo won its first title after defeating 3–0 in the Championship playoff final.

2013–14 season teams

2013–14 season standings

Championship playoffs

All times are CEST, except for Canary Islands which is WEST.

Bracket
To best of three games.

Semifinals

Match 1

|}

Match 2

|}

Match 3

|}

Match 4

|}

Match 5

|}

Final

Match 1

|}

Match 2

|}

Match 3

|}

Top scorers
(This statistics includes regular season and playoff matches.)

References

External links
Official website

1ªFemale
2013 in women's volleyball
2013 in Spanish sport
2014 in women's volleyball
2014 in Spanish sport